Moscow City Duma District 36 is one of 45 constituencies in Moscow City Duma. The constituency covers parts of South-Western Moscow. District 36 was created in 2013, after Moscow City Duma had been expanded from 35 to 45 seats.

Members elected

Election results

2014

|-
! colspan=2 style="background-color:#E9E9E9;text-align:left;vertical-align:top;" |Candidate
! style="background-color:#E9E9E9;text-align:left;vertical-align:top;" |Party
! style="background-color:#E9E9E9;text-align:right;" |Votes
! style="background-color:#E9E9E9;text-align:right;" |%
|-
|style="background-color:"|
|align=left|Olga Sharapova
|align=left|Independent
|
|50.08%
|-
|style="background-color:"|
|align=left|Sergey Ross
|align=left|A Just Russia
|
|15.93%
|-
|style="background-color:"|
|align=left|Nikolay Volkov
|align=left|Communist Party
|
|15.01%
|-
|style="background-color:"|
|align=left|Grigory Semenov
|align=left|Yabloko
|
|11.57%
|-
|style="background-color:"|
|align=left|Vladimir Grinchenko
|align=left|Liberal Democratic Party
|
|3.74%
|-
| colspan="5" style="background-color:#E9E9E9;"|
|- style="font-weight:bold"
| colspan="3" style="text-align:left;" | Total
| 
| 100%
|-
| colspan="5" style="background-color:#E9E9E9;"|
|- style="font-weight:bold"
| colspan="4" |Source:
|
|}

2019

|-
! colspan=2 style="background-color:#E9E9E9;text-align:left;vertical-align:top;" |Candidate
! style="background-color:#E9E9E9;text-align:left;vertical-align:top;" |Party
! style="background-color:#E9E9E9;text-align:right;" |Votes
! style="background-color:#E9E9E9;text-align:right;" |%
|-
|style="background-color:"|
|align=left|Olga Sharapova (incumbent)
|align=left|Independent
|
|35.23%
|-
|style="background-color:"|
|align=left|Sergey Kurgansky
|align=left|Communist Party
|
|35.15%
|-
|style="background-color:"|
|align=left|Dmitry Repnikov
|align=left|Liberal Democratic Party
|
|11.73%
|-
|style="background-color:"|
|align=left|Olesya Ryabtseva
|align=left|A Just Russia
|
|6.94%
|-
|style="background-color:"|
|align=left|Aleksey Pokatayev
|align=left|Communists of Russia
|
|4.24%
|-
|style="background-color:"|
|align=left|Artyom Papeta
|align=left|Independent
|
|3.51%
|-
| colspan="5" style="background-color:#E9E9E9;"|
|- style="font-weight:bold"
| colspan="3" style="text-align:left;" | Total
| 
| 100%
|-
| colspan="5" style="background-color:#E9E9E9;"|
|- style="font-weight:bold"
| colspan="4" |Source:
|
|}

References

Moscow City Duma districts